The American Journal of Neuroradiology is a monthly peer-reviewed medical journal covering neuroradiology. It was established in 1980 and is published by the American Society of Neuroradiology. The editor-in-chief is Jeffrey S. Ross (Mayo Clinic College of Medicine, Phoenix, Arizona).

Abstracting and indexing
The journal is abstracted and indexed in:
BIOSIS Previews
Current Contents/Clinical Medicine
Current Contents/Life Sciences
Embase
Index Medicus/MEDLINE/PubMed
Science Citation Index
Scopus
According to the Journal Citation Reports, the journal has a 2017 impact factor of 3.653.

References

External links

Radiology and medical imaging journals
Publications established in 1980
Monthly journals
English-language journals
Neuroradiology